Goshen is an unincorporated community in Tuscarawas County, in the U.S. state of Ohio.

History
Goshen was originally built up chiefly by Germans. An old variant name of Goshen was Beidler. A post office called Beidler was established in 1888, and remained in operation until 1916.

References

Unincorporated communities in Tuscarawas County, Ohio
Unincorporated communities in Ohio